Stockwin is a surname. Notable people with the surname include:

Arthur Stockwin (born 1937), British political scientist
Julian Stockwin (born 1944), English writer